A list of the current and former chapters, colonies, and interest groups of Triangle Fraternity.

Chapters

Collegiate Chapters
Active chapters are indicated in bold; inactive chapters are indicated in italic.

Colonies and Interest Groups

The Interest Group category has been retired by the fraternity, and has been folded into the Colony designation. Active chapters are indicated in bold; inactive chapters are indicated in italic.

Statistics

New Chapters By Decade

Chapters By Region

References

External links
 Triangle Fraternity — The Fraternity of Engineers, Architects, and Scientists

Lists of chapters of United States student societies by society
chapters